"Killed by Death" is a song by the English heavy metal band Motörhead. Released in 1984, in 7" and 12" vinyl pressings. It peaked at number 51 in the UK Singles Chart.

Promotion
To assist its promotion in the United States, Bronze/Island pressed a 12" promo version for radio play (identical versions on both sides). It is one of the most difficult to find of all Motörhead items. There is also a video made for the track, directed by the manager of the Plasmatics, Rod Swenson, which was banned by MTV for "excessive and senseless violence".

Despite relatively high-profile exposure on TV programmes such as Channel 4's The Tube, the single failed to make any significant impression on the UK Singles Chart. This proved particularly disappointing to Lemmy, who at live shows regularly made joking references about its lack of sales.

Releases
The original song is not included on any official release albums except the compilation album No Remorse, along with three other new songs, "Snaggletooth", "Steal Your Face" and "Locomotive". It is included on several other retrospective budget-release compilations, and on live albums such as Nö Sleep at All.

Both the 7" and 12" formats feature the B-side "Under the Knife". The 12" issue has a second B-side, a different track also entitled Under the Knife, and came with a free colour poster. The title song is taken from the No Remorse compilation album. Bronze Records also issued a shaped picture disc (approx 12") version of the 7" vinyl release, depicting the band's logo. Some lapses in quality control accidentally allowed a number of pressings that play King Kurt on the B-side.

Live performances
The song itself used to be a mainstay of live performances since release. As with many Motörhead songs, the lyrics show Lemmy's skill at composing lyrics which are at the same time menacing and tongue-in-cheek. Another common theme is Lemmy's use of animal images. Phrases such as "If you squeeze my lizard, I'll put my snake on you, I'm a romantic adventure, And I'm a reptile too" recall the song "Love Me like a Reptile" from the earlier Ace of Spades album. The second verse also contains the line, "I'm a lone-wolf ligger".

Legacy
A re-recorded version, entitled "Killed by Death '08", is in the Rock Band Metal Track Pack.

In 2012, Loudwire ranked the song number two on their list of the top 10 Motörhead songs, and in 2021, Louder Sound ranked the song number 12 on their list of the top 50 Motörhead songs.

The song was used in sequences set in Hell in Heist, a British TV comedy-drama.

The song is featured in the 2006 video game Scarface: The World Is Yours.

"Killed by Death" was covered by German power metal band Paragon, by all-female Swedish metal band Crucified Barbara, and on the 2nd album by Finnish power metal band Beast In Black "From Hell with Love" (2019).

The lyrics of the song's first verse are used as an epigraph in Bruce Craven's 1993 novel Fast Sofa.

Track listing
All tracks written by Lemmy, Würzel, Phil Campbell and Pete Gill.

Personnel 
Motörhead
 Lemmy – lead vocals, bass
 Phil "Wizzö" Campbell – guitars
 Würzel – guitars
 Pete Gill – drums
Production
 Fin Costello – photography
 Steve Joule – designer

References

External links
 Sample of the song at the Motörhead Official Site  (RealPlayer required).

Motörhead songs
1984 singles
Songs written by Lemmy
Songs written by Würzel
Songs written by Phil Campbell (musician)
Songs written by Pete Gill
1984 songs
Song recordings produced by Vic Maile